Desterro do Melo is a Brazilian municipality located in the south of the state of Minas Gerais. Its population in 2020 was 2,884 people in a total area of 142 km².   The altitude of the municipal seat is 1,085 meters.  The city belongs to the mesoregion of Campo das Vertentes and to the microregion of Barbacena.

Desterro do Melo lies to the east of Barbacena and is connected to this regional center b MG-135.  The distance is 35 km.  The region is characterized by low mountains, many of which still retain natural tropical forest.  Like most of the municipalities in this region there is cultivation of coffee, bananas, rice, sugarcane, beans, and corn.  Farms are small and cattle raising is mainly for milk and cheese production. 
In 2007 there were 293 automobiles in the municipality.   There was one health clinic, 5 primary schools, and one middle school (2005).  

Municipal Human Development Index 
MHDI ranking: .689
State ranking: 594 out of 853 municipalities
National ranking: 3,170 out of 5,138 municipalities
Life expectancy: 69
Literacy rate: 77

See also
 List of municipalities in Minas Gerais

References

Municipalities in Minas Gerais